The history of Olympia, Washington, includes long-term habitation by Native Americans, charting by a famous English explorer, settlement of the town in the 1840s, the controversial siting of a state college in the 1960s and the ongoing development of arts and culture from a variety of influences.

Pre-European history

Olympia is situated at the extreme southern tip of Puget Sound on Budd Inlet.  The site of Olympia was home to Lushootseed-speaking peoples for thousands of years. The abundant shellfish in the tideflats and the many salmon-spawning streams entering Puget Sound at this point made it a productive food-gathering area. Many tribes shared access to these resources, including Squaxin, Nisqually, Puyallup, Chehalis, Suquamish, and Duwamish.  According to early settlers' accounts, natives called the present site of Olympia "Cheet Woot" or "Schictwoot", meaning "the place of the bear."

European contact
The first recorded visit by Europeans was in 1792 when Peter Puget and a crew from the British Vancouver Expedition charted the site. In 1833, the Hudson's Bay Company established Fort Nisqually, a trading post at Sequalitchew Creek near present-day DuPont, Washington. As the fur trade declined, the HBC diversified, forming a subsidiary called Pugets Sound Agricultural Company and converted former trade posts including Fort Nisqually into working farms. The U.S. Exploring Expedition under Lt. Charles Wilkes explored the Puget Sound region in 1841. They camped near Fort Nisqually while they charted the area and named Budd Inlet after expedition member Thomas A. Budd.

Settlement
The first known European to reside at the future site of Olympia was Thomas K Otchin, an English Hudson Bay Company employee who took up a claim in 1841 but abandoned it by 1842.

American settlers came to the area in the 1840s, drawn by the water-power potential of Tumwater Falls and established nearby "New Market," now known as Tumwater, the first American settlement on Puget Sound.  The site was the northern end of the "Cowlitz Portage," the overland trail between the Cowlitz River and Puget Sound. In a time when water travel was the easiest form of transportation, Olympia's location on the north end of the main route through the area made it a crossroads for regional trade.

In 1846 Edmund Sylvester and Levi Lathrop Smith jointly claimed the land that now comprises downtown Olympia. Smith built his cabin and enclosed two acres for a garden and livestock near the current intersection of Capitol Way and Olympia Avenue. In 1848 Smith was elected to the Oregon Provisional Legislature. In the same year, while canoeing to Tumwater, he had a seizure and died by drowning. His untimely death in 1848 left his partner and friend, Sylvester the sole owner of the land on which he platted the future townsite. Early names for the settlement included "Smithfield" and "Smithter" in honor of Levi Smith. In 1853 the town settled on the name Olympia, at the suggestion of local resident Isaac N. Ebey, due to its view of the Olympic Mountains to the northwest.

At the request of the Hudson's Bay Company, French Catholic missionaries established Mission St. Joseph of Newmarket and school in the 1848 at Priest Point near the future townsite for the conversion of natives to Catholicism.

1850–1890

In 1851, the U.S. Congress established the Customs District of Puget Sound and Olympia became the official customs port of entry requiring all ships to call at Olympia first.  In 1854, the customs house moved to Port Townsend at the entrance to Puget Sound to better monitor shipping activity.  In 1852, Olympia became the county seat of the newly organized Thurston County which at the time was still part of Oregon Territory.

In about 1853, Ezra Meeker says that Olympia contained about 100 inhabitants; it had 3 stores, a hotel, a livery stable, a saloon, and a weekly newspaper called The Columbian, which was in its 30th publish.

By the early 1850s American settlers began agitating to separate the area north of the Columbia River from Oregon Territory. The agitation resulted in Congress creating Washington Territory. Isaac I. Stevens served as its first governor. Upon his arrival in 1853, Stevens designated Olympia capital of the new territory.  The first territorial legislature convened early in 1854 at the Parker and Colter store on Main Street (now Capital Way) between State Street and Olympia Ave.  Olympia's Daniel Bigelow represented Thurston County in the first three legislatures.  His family home still stands, now known as Bigelow House Museum, Olympia's oldest surviving home.

The city grew steadily until 1873, when the Northern Pacific Railroad building a line toward Puget Sound unexpectedly bypassed Olympia, choosing Tacoma as its west coast terminus. Alarmed by the loss of the railroad,  Olympia residents set to work building their own rail connection to the main line at Tenino. Citizens formed a private corporation to raise money and build a connection. One of the early contributors was black businesswoman, Rebecca G. Howard, whose contribution of 80 acres of land was used by the committee to encourage like contributions. The corporation used both volunteer labor and contract Chinese workers to complete a narrow gauge line by 1878. The little railroad served as Olympia's only railroad connection until the Northern Pacific built a spur to Olympia in 1891.

After Washington achieved statehood in 1889, Olympia continued as the state's capital city. Construction of the current Washington State Capitol began in 1912, with the prominent Legislative Building, one of the largest in the nation, completed in 1928. The building's dome is the fourth largest free-standing masonry dome in the world.

Aside from its role as the seat of state government, Olympia was a fairly typical Pacific Northwest town. Early on, extraction industries such as logging and oystering were the basis of much of the economy. By the twentieth century, sawmilling, fruit canning, and other industrial concerns comprised its economic base. Olympia also served as a shipping port for materials produced from the surrounding countryside, including sandstone, coal, and agricultural products.

1890–1950

Olympia is often associated with the Olympia Brewing Company, which from 1896–2003 brewed Olympia Beer, even though the brewery was actually located in Tumwater. The Olympia Brewing Company began producing beer in 1896 at a site along the Deschutes River and continued until Prohibition. After Prohibition ended, a new brewery was erected just upstream from the original site. This brewery was eventually purchased by SABMiller and closed on July 1, 2003.

Scandinavian immigrants founded two cooperative plywood mills after World War I. During World War I and World War II, there were also increased influxes of workers attracted by wartime industries including shipbuilding.

Periodic earthquakes affect the Olympia area.  The 1949 earthquake damaged many historic downtown buildings beyond repair, and they were demolished. Others were retrofit with new facades to replace the damaged Nineteenth century wood and glass storefronts. Subsequently, much of Olympia's downtown reflects mid-twentieth-century architectural trends.  Olympia also suffered significant damage from the 1965 Puget Sound and 2001 Nisqually earthquakes. It was the closest major city to the epicenter of the 2001 event.

1960–present

Since the 1960s Olympia has lost much of its earlier waterfront industry, including lumber and plywood mills, shipbuilding, power pole manufacture and other concerns.  While the shipping port and log staging area remains, Olympia's waterfront area has gentrified since the 1980s.

In 1967, the state legislature approved the creation of The Evergreen State College near Olympia, mostly due to the efforts of progressive Republican Governor Daniel J. Evans. Evans later served as president of the college, leaving Evergreen in 1983 when he was appointed to the United States Senate to fill the vacancy caused by Senator Henry M. "Scoop" Jackson's death.

Because of the college's presence, Olympia has become a hub for artists and musicians (many of whom have been influential in punk, post-punk, anti-folk, lo-fi and other music trends (see Olympia music scene). In 2003 Outside Magazine named Olympia one of the best college towns in the nation for its vibrant downtown and access to outdoor activities.

Olympia is a regional center for social justice and environmental activism. Olympia was the hometown of  activist Rachel Corrie. Olympia has been the site of direct-action opposition to the Iraq War.

Olympia hosts the state's largest annual Earth Day celebration, Procession of the Species, a community arts-based festival and parade. Also popular is the Olympia farmer's market, the second largest in Washington State, as well as the locally based Olympia Food Co-op.

See also
 History of Washington
Captain Hale House

References

External links
The Olympia Historical Society & Bigelow House Museum
The Olympia Genealogy Society
State Capital Museum and Outreach Center